This is a list of palaces in Serbia. The list includes preserved, restored, and remains (ruins) of palaces (palate), châteaux and castles (dvorci and zamci), courts (dvorovi), residences (konaci), villas (vile), etc. There are over 200 palaces in Serbia, including manor houses. Palaces in Serbia are preserved from the Roman, Byzantine, medieval Serbian and post-Ottoman eras, with most being built after the 16th century. The majority of palaces have been renovated throughout history, as well as changing ownership, use, or original intent. Many palaces are used for different institutions, such as the Obrenović Palace originally being the royal palace of the Obrenović dynasty, now housing the City Assembly of Belgrade. This list does not include military castles and fortifications, which are listed in a separate article.

List

Palaces located within Kosovo are indicated in grey.

Annotations

Further reading

See also
Cultural Heritage of Serbia
List of World Heritage Sites in Serbia
Immovable Cultural Heritage of Great Importance (Serbia)
List of Serbian royal residences
List of cities in Serbia
List of fortifications in Serbia

External links
The Castles of Serbia dvorcisrbije.rs
Castles in Vojvodina dvorci.info

 
 
Ruins in Serbia
Royal residences in Serbia
Palaces
Serbia
Palaces